Nikolaos Giantsopoulos (born June 24, 1994) is a Canadian professional soccer player who plays as a goalkeeper for York United in the Canadian Premier League.

Early life
Giantsopoulos played youth soccer with Unionville Milliken SC, Pickering SC, and Ajax SC. With Ajax, he won the national U18 championship in 2011.

College career

Adrian College
In 2012, he began his college career with NCAA Division III school Adrian College in Michigan.  He won All-MIAA first team accolades and NSCAA Division III All-Central region honors in 2013. He played there for two seasons, but decided to transfer schools after the soccer coaching staff was relieved of their duties.

Calvin College
Despite interest from NCAA Division I and Division II schools, he decided to transfer to Division III Calvin College.  In his two seasons at Calvin, he was named to the All-MIAA first team and the NSCAA Division III All-Central Region first team twice as well as the NSCAA Division III All-America third team.  He help lead them to the MIAA championship and advanced to the second round of the NCAA Division III Tournament. During his two years as Calvin's starting goalkeeper, he posted a win-loss record of 40-3-4, including a 28-0 record in MIAA competition.

Club career

Durham United
He served as an unused substitute keeper for Durham United FC for a match in League1 Ontario in 2014, but did not play.

Ocala Stampede
In 2015, he played for the Ocala Stampede in the Premier Development League.

Devonport City
In March 2016, Giantsopoulos joined Devonport City in the NPL Tasmania, the second tier of soccer in Australia. He started all 21 matches for Devonport in the 2016 season, helping to lead the team to a league championship and was named to the NPL Tasmania Team of the Year. In the 90th minute of the Round of 16 match in the FFA Cup against Bentleigh Greens with the score at 0-0, he suffered a shoulder injury and was forced to leave the game, which Devonport ultimately lost 1-0, after extra time.  As a result of the injury, he also missed the Semi-Finals and Finals of the NPL Tasmania Playoff Series, where Devonport ultimately lost in the Finals, as well as the NPL Finals Series for the champions of each of the regional leagues. He won the inaugural "Players' Player" Award.

Broadmeadow Magic
In 2017, he joined Broadmeadow Magic in the NPL Northern NSW, a different regional league in the same second tier of Australian soccer.

Launceston City
Giantsopoulos would return to the Tasmania regional division, signing with NPL Tasmania club Lauceston City for the 2018 season. He would be named vice-captain of the club, and would start all 21 matches in 2018.  On August 18, in a match against South Hobart, as a penalty shot was about to be taken, Giantsopoulos ran up and kicked the ball away before it could be taken.  He was yellow carded, but his antics proved to be effective, as the ensuing penalty shot was missed.  The incident became a viral video around the world. This was part of a streak of three consecutive penalty saves in three matches for Giantsopoulos. He was named to the NPL Tasmania Team of the Year at the end of the season.

Cavalry FC
Giantsopoulos returned to Canada and signed with Cavalry FC of the Canadian Premier League on January 23, 2019.  He served as the backup goalkeeper behind Marco Carducci. He made his debut on May 16 in a Canadian Championship match against Pacific FC.  After the season, he re-signed with the club for an additional year. After two years with Cavalry, Giantsopoulos would leave after the 2020 season in an attempt to gain more playing time. In his limited playing time for Cavalry, Giantsopoulos earned four clean sheets and had the best save percentage of any CPL goalkeeper.

York United FC
On November 10, 2020, Giantsopoulos signed a two-year contract with his hometown club, York United. He made his debut for York United on July 7, 2021 in a 2-1 victory over Valour FC.

On May 20, 2022, immediately after earning a clean sheet against Pacific FC, Giantsopoulos joined Major League Soccer club Vancouver Whitecaps FC on loan for their match on May 22, as the Whitecaps were left without any of their three goalkeepers due to injury and COVID protocols. He did not feature in the match, serving as an unused substitute. His loan expired on May 23, allowing him to return to play for York in their Canadian Championship match on May 24, where he made the game-winning save in the penalty shootout to advance to the semi-finals, where coincidentally, York would match-up against Vancouver. In December 2022, he resigned with York United on a one-year contract.

Media career
In 2021, along with his club team York United FC, Giantsopolous launched a podcast series called  ‘The Last Line: A Goalkeeper’s Podcast’. In March 2022, he became the co-host of a radio talk show focussed on soccer called 'Footy First' on TSN Radio 1050.

Career statistics

Honours

Club
Devonport City
NPL Tasmania Champions: 2016
NPL Tasmania Playoff Runner-Up: 2016
Milan Lakoseljac Cup Champions: 2016

Calvary FC
Canadian Premier League (Regular season): 
Champions: Spring 2019, Fall 2019
 Canadian Premier League Finals
Runners-up: 2019

Individual
NPL Tasmania Team of the Year: 2016, 2018

References

External links

1994 births
Living people
Association football goalkeepers
Canadian soccer players
Soccer people from Ontario
Sportspeople from Markham, Ontario
Canadian people of Greek descent
Canadian expatriate soccer players
Expatriate soccer players in the United States
Canadian expatriate sportspeople in the United States
Expatriate soccer players in Australia
Canadian expatriate sportspeople in Australia
Adrian Bulldogs men's soccer players
Calvin Knights men's soccer players
Launceston City FC players
Cavalry FC players
York United FC players
National Premier Leagues players
Canadian Premier League players
Unionville Milliken SC players
Pickering FC players
Ocala Stampede players
USL League Two players